Gaasyendietha (Seneca) – Dragon
 Gagana (Russian) – Iron-beaked bird with copper talons
 Gaki (Japanese) – Ghosts of especially greedy people
 Gallu (Mesopotamian) – Underworld demons
 Galtzagorriak (Basque) – Small demonic servants
 Gamayun (Russian) – Prophetic human-headed bird
 Gana (Hindu) – Attendants of Shiva
 Gancanagh (Irish) – Male fairy that seduces human women
 Gandabherunda (Hindu) – Double-headed bird
 Gandharva (Hindu) – Male nature spirits, often depicted as part human, part animal
 Gargouille (French) – Water dragon
 Garkain (Australian Aboriginal) – Flying humanoid who envelops his victims
 Garmr (Norse) – Giant, ravenous hound
 Garuda (Hindu) – Human-eagle hybrid
 Gashadokuro (Japanese) – Giant malevolent skeletons
 Gaueko (Basque) – Wolf capable of walking upright
 Geb (Egyptian) – God of the Earth, married to Nut
 Ged (Heraldic) – The fish pike
 Gegenees (Greek) – Six-armed giant
 Genius loci (Roman) – Spirit that protects a specific place
 German (Slavic) – Male spirit associated with bringing rain and hail
 Geryon (Greek) – Three-headed six-armed giant with three torsos and (in some sources) six legs
 Ghillie Dhu (Scottish) – Tree guardian
 Ghost – Disembodied spirits of those that have died
 Ghoul (Arabian) – Cannibalistic shapeshifting desert genie often classified as undead.
 Giant (Worldwide) – Immensely large and strong humanoids
 Giant animal (Worldwide) – Unusually large beasts
 Gichi-anami'e-bizhiw (Ojibwa) – Bison-snake-bird-cougar hybrid water spirit
 Gidim (Sumerian) – Ghost
 Gigantes (Greek) – Race of giants that fought the Olympian gods, sometimes depicted with snake-legs
 Gigelorum (Scottish) – Smallest animal
 Girtablilu (Akkadian) – Human-scorpion hybrid
 Gjenganger (Scandinavian) – Corporeal ghost
 Glaistig (Scottish) – Human-goat hybrid
 Glashtyn (Manx) – Malevolent water horse
 Gnome (Alchemy) – Diminutive Earth elemental
 Goblin (Medieval) – Grotesque, mischievous little people
 Gog (English) – Giant protector of London
 Gold-digging ant (Medieval Bestiaries) – Dog-sized ant that digs for gold in sandy areas
 Golem (Jewish) – Animated construct
 Gorgades (Medieval Bestiary) – Hairy humanoid
 Gorgon (Greek) – Fanged, snake-haired humanoids that turn anyone who sees them into stone
 Goryō (Japanese) – Vengeful ghosts, usually of martyrs
 Grassman (Ohio, USA) – Ape-like cryptid
 Gremlin (Folklore) – Creatures that sabotage airplanes
 Griffin (Heraldic) – Lion-eagle hybrid
 Grigori (Christian, Jewish, and Islamic mythology) – Fallen angels, father of Nephilim
 Grim (English and Scandinavian) – Tutelary spirits of churches
 Grim Reaper (Worldwide) – Death angel often thought to be God's/Satan's assistant
 Grindylow (English) – Malevolent water spirit
 Gualichu (Mapuche) – Malevolent spirit
 Guardian angel (Christian, Jewish, and Islamic belief) – Subclassification of angels that guard and protect a specific person or living being
 Gud-elim (Akkadian) – Human-bull hybrid
 Guhin (Japanese) – Anthropomorphic bird
 Gui Po (Chinese) – Ghost that manifests as an old woman
 Gui Shu (Chinese) – Ghostly tree that confuses travelers by moving
 Gulon (Germanic) – Gluttonous dog-cat-fox hybrid
 Gumiho (Korean mythology) – Demonic fox with thousands of tails believed to possess an army of spirits and magic in its tails
 Gurangatch (Australian Aboriginal) - An enormous reptile-fish whose movements carved out the landscape south of the Blue Mountains
 Gurumapa (Nepalese) – Child-eating demon
 Gwyllgi (Welsh) – Black dog
 Gwyllion (Welsh) – Malevolent spirit
 Gyascutus (American folklore) – Four-legged herbivore
 Gytrash (Lincolnshire and Yorkshire) – Black dog
 Gyūki (Japanese) – Bull-headed monster

G